The Lotus Eaters are an English new wave band formed in 1982 in Liverpool. Their debut single, "The First Picture of You", became a hit in the UK and in continental Europe, notably France, Italy, Belgium and Spain.

History

Formation and success
In September 1982, Peter Coyle and Jeremy "Jem" Kelly met for the first time. Kelly had been guitarist in the Dance Party with Michael Head and co-founded the Wild Swans in 1980. Coyle had previously been in the Jass Babies, who had recorded a session for John Peel's BBC Radio 1 show in 1981.

After an invitation to record a Peel session, a number of new songs were created. Joined on keyboards by Kelly's fellow ex-Wild Swans member Ged Quinn, drummer Alan Wills and bassist Phil Lucking, the session was recorded in October 1982 and included "The First Picture of You". This led to the band being signed by Arista Records.

Produced by Nigel Gray, "The First Picture of You" became an iconic song for the Lotus Eaters in 1983, giving them a UK hit single before the band had even played a live gig. The band recorded a second session for Peel in October 1983.

The band's debut studio album, No Sense of Sin, was released in 1984 on Arista subsidiary Sylvan Records, preceded by two further singles, "You Don't Need Someone New" and "Out on Your Own". Both of these songs hit the top 100 of the UK Singles Chart, but owing to difficulties with producers and marketing, the impact of "The First Picture of You" was not repeated in the UK.

Line-up changes and disbandment
After Quinn left, Coyle and Kelly recruited bassist Michael Dempsey (the Cure, Associates), keyboard player Stephen Emmer (formerly of Minny Pops and Associates) and drummer Steve Crease. The Lotus Eaters toured extensively in the UK, France and Italy before going on hiatus in 1985 after parting ways with Arista. "It Hurts", their final single, charted in the Italian Top 5 that year, but the band had already split up, leaving a promotional video featuring footage of Louise Brooks to represent them.

Aftermath
Coyle recorded as a solo artist, releasing the albums A Slap in the Face for Public Taste and I'd Sacrifice Eight Orgasms with Shirley MacLaine Just to Be There, and went on to found dance company 8 Productions and the G-Love nightclub. As a songwriter/producer, he had success with Marina Van-Rooy's 1990 single "Sly One", and worked with a host of emerging artists on Liverpool's dance scene. Coyle later pursued academic interests at the University of Edinburgh.

Meanwhile, Kelly reformed the Wild Swans, releasing the Bringing Home the Ashes album on Sire in 1988. He co-wrote an album, Soul Fire (released in 2001), with Tom Hingley (ex-Inspiral Carpets), before leaving to study for a PhD in memory-themed multimedia theatre at the University of Reading. Since 1989, Kelly has been writing, staging and performing in music-driven theatre, including Phantoms of the Aperture Part 1: Ted (2015) and Phantoms of the Aperture Part 2: Pictures of Me (2016) examining intersections of time, space, memory and music.

A compilation album of the Lotus Eaters' music, First Picture of You, was released in 1998 by Vinyl Japan/BBC Worldwide, consisting of sessions recorded at BBC Radio 1. No Sense of Sin was reissued that same year by Arista Japan.

Reunion
In 2001, the Lotus Eaters, comprising the duo of Coyle and Kelly, reformed after almost two decades, recording and releasing a new album titled Silentspace on the Vinyl Japan label.

On 13 March 2009, the band announced a one-off concert to be held at the Liverpool Philharmonic Hall on 25 July. The gig, a performance of the album No Sense of Sin, featured Coyle, Kelly and Emmer accompanied by a string quartet from the University of Huddersfield.

In April 2009, Coyle and Kelly collaborated with Emmer, and announced that they were working with producer Steve Power on material for a new album called A Plug-in Called Nostalgia, which has yet to be released. A limited-edition acoustic album, Differance, was issued the following year as a limited release on Sylvan.

The Lotus Eaters played their first London show in 10 years at the Camden Barfly on 11 June 2010, followed by a string of shows in the UK. The band also toured in Japan in October 2010, with gigs in Tokyo and Osaka.

In 2015, the band announced on their Facebook page that they were still working to release A Plug-in Called Nostalgia.

In 2017, Coyle performed solo in a one-night-only show in Manila.

Discography

Studio albums

Singles

Compilation albums
 First Picture of You (BBC and live sessions, 1982-1984) (1998, Vinyl Japan/BBC Worldwide)

References

External links

 Peter Coyle's website
 Jem Kelly - repeaterperformance
 

English new wave musical groups
Musical groups established in 1981
Musical groups disestablished in 1985
Musical groups reestablished in 2002
Musical groups from Liverpool
Arista Records artists
Cherry Red Records artists